= Chen Rio =

Beach in Mexico

- Beach
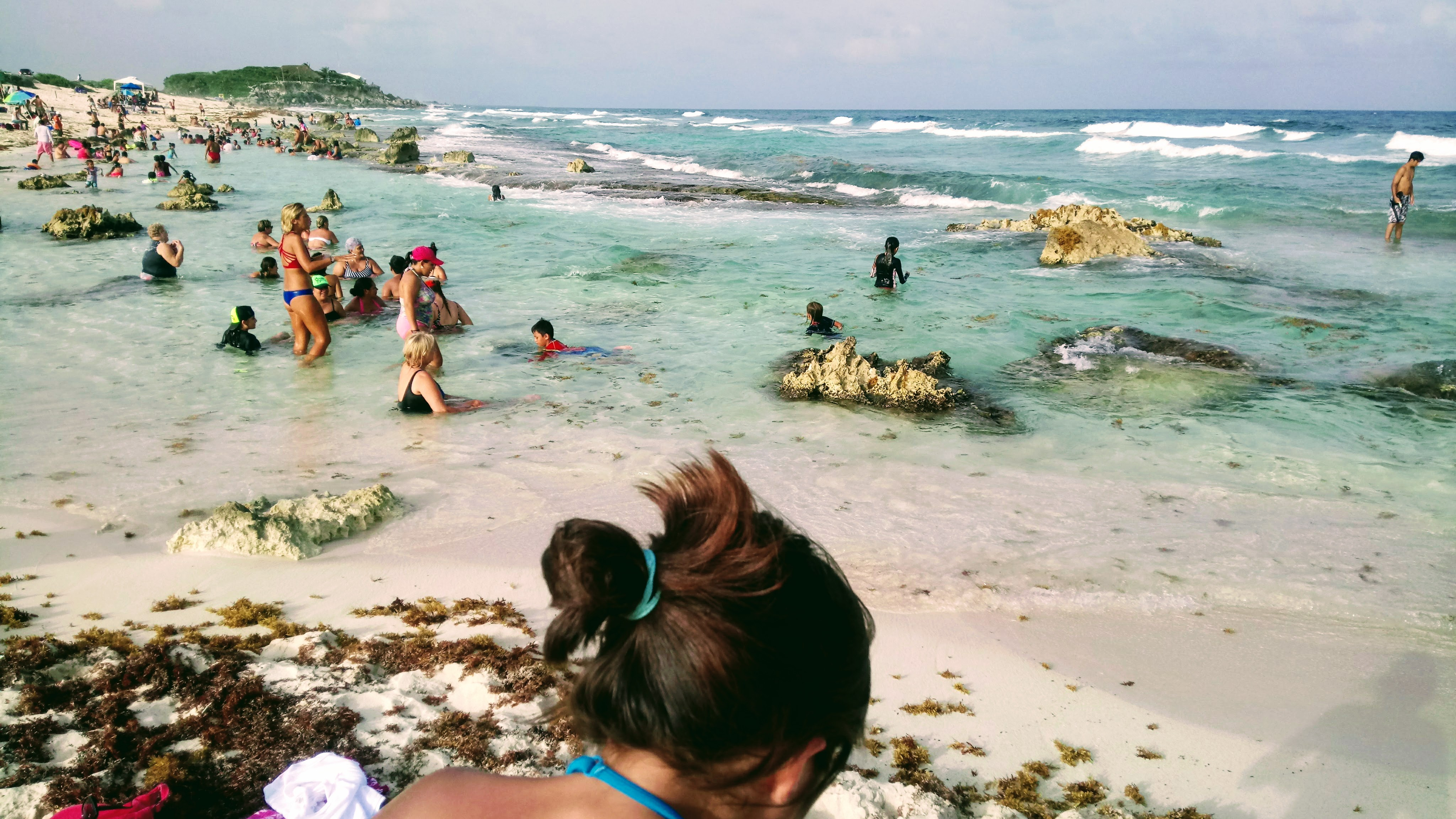
- Chen Rio
- Interactive map of Chen Rio
- Location: Cozumel, Mexico
- Access: Open

Chen Rio is the name of a popular beach at the Southeastern shore of Mexican Caribbean island Cozumel. The name Chen Rio is derived from the river in the hinterland of the beach.

Cozumel's Eastern shore is not protected by a reef, so swimming is in general dangerous, but Chen Rio offers a small pool separated from the open sea by a rocky rim, which makes it popular. There are also restaurants close to the beach.
